Fredy Hernando Hernández Camacho (born April 25, 1978, in Bogotá) is a male race walker from Colombia. He twice competed for his native country at the Pan American Games (2003 and 2007).  He also competed for Colombia at the 2012 Summer Olympics.

Personal bests

Achievements

References

External links

1978 births
Living people
Colombian male racewalkers
Athletes (track and field) at the 2003 Pan American Games
Athletes (track and field) at the 2007 Pan American Games
Athletes (track and field) at the 2011 Pan American Games
Sportspeople from Bogotá
Pan American Games competitors for Colombia
Athletes (track and field) at the 2012 Summer Olympics
Olympic athletes of Colombia
Central American and Caribbean Games bronze medalists for Colombia
Competitors at the 2002 Central American and Caribbean Games
Central American and Caribbean Games medalists in athletics
20th-century Colombian people
21st-century Colombian people